Harald is a chain of restaurants in Finland. Currently the chain includes eight restaurants, in Helsinki, Jyväskylä, Kuopio, Lahti, Oulu, Tampere, Turku and Espoo. The first restaurant was founded in Tampere in 1997.

Overview 

The Harald restaurants are themed after the Viking Age. The menu, consisting mostly of meat and fish in various forms, accompanied with vegetables and sauces, is close to what the Vikings may have eaten, but slightly modified to suit the modern taste. The interior and the outfits of the staff also have a Viking-era look.

External links
 Official website

Restaurant chains in Finland
Regional restaurant chains
Theme restaurants
Scandinavian restaurants
Restaurants established in 1997